The Embassy of the Republic of Italy in Moscow is the chief diplomatic mission of Italy in the Russian Federation. It is located at 5 Denezhny Lane in the Khamovniki District of Moscow.

The Italian Embassy in Moscow is located in the "Berg Villa", built in 1897 by the Russian merchant Sergei Berg. The building was assigned to the Italian Government in 1924.

See also 
 Italy–Russia relations
 Diplomatic missions in Russia

References

Bibliography 
  As described in

External links 
  Embassy of Italy in Moscow

Italy–Russia relations
Italy–Soviet Union relations
Italy
Moscow
Khamovniki District